Freakazoid! is an American cartoon television series that aired on Kids' WB from 1995 to 1997.

Freakazoid may also refer to:

Television
 Freakazoid, the main protagonist of the American television show Freakazoid!

Film
 Freakazoids a direct-to-video series of adult entertainment videos from studio Elegant Angel
 Freakazoids, 2002 direct-to-video from Elegant Angel which won an award at the 19th AVN Awards
 Freakazoids 2, 2003 direct-to-video from Elegant Angel which was nominated for an award at the 20th AVN Awards

Music
 "Freakazoid", a song by the Silversun Pickups from the 2019 album Widow's Weeds
 Freakazoids (album), 2002 album by Praga Khan
 "Freakazoidz", a song from the above album
 "Freakazoid", a song by Missy Elliott, see Missy Elliott production discography
 "Freakazoids", a song by the Jacuzzi Boys used on the soundtrack to the 2011 film Dragonslayer
 "Freak-A-Zoid", a 1983 song by Midnight Star from the album No Parking on the Dance Floor

Other uses
 FREAKAZOiD, username for Ryan Abadir, American e-sports player

See also

 
 
 Freak (disambiguation)
 Zoid (disambiguation)